Frank Hume (July 21, 1843 – July 17, 1906) was an American politician who served in the Virginia House of Delegates. The Hume School is named for him, and the Frank Hume Memorial Fountain, known as the "whispering wall", at the University of Virginia was built in his honor. In 2022, the memorial’s engraved stones were replaced with plain stone.

During the Civil War, Hume fought with the Volunteer Southrons in the Confederate Army and received a thigh wound at the Battle of Gettysburg. Following the war, he had a clerkship in the Barruch Hall store in Washington, after which he and Richard Poole formed the Poole & Hume business. Hume took full control after Poole became ill, and he continued in charge until he died.

In 1870, Hume married Emma Phipps Norris. They had nine children.

References

External links 

Democratic Party members of the Virginia House of Delegates
19th-century American politicians
20th-century American politicians
1843 births
1906 deaths